Appendicospora is a genus of fungi in the family Apiosporaceae.

Species
 Appendicospora coryphae (Hyde, 1995)
 Appendicospora hongkongensis (Yanna et al., 1997)

References

External links
Appendicospora at Index Fungorum

Xylariales